La Royère Castle is a ruined medieval castle in Néchin in the municipality of Estaimpuis, province of Hainaut, Wallonia, Belgium.

See also
List of castles in Belgium

External links
La Royère Castle www.castles.nl
Château de la Royère

Castles in Belgium
Castles in Hainaut (province)